Timanthes is a 1770 tragedy by the British writer John Hoole.

The original Covent Garden cast included William Smith as Timanthes, Robert Bensley as Demaphoon, Richard Wroughton as Cherinthus, Mary Bulkley as Cephisa and Mary Ann Yates as Ismena.

References

Bibliography
 Nicoll, Allardyce. A History of English Drama 1660–1900: Volume III. Cambridge University Press, 2009.
 Hogan, C.B (ed.) The London Stage, 1660–1800: Volume V. Southern Illinois University Press, 1968.

1770 plays
British plays
Tragedy plays
West End plays